= Resource Conservation and Development Program =

The Resource Conservation and Development Program (RC&D), initiated in 1962 under authority of Food and Agriculture Act of 1962 (P.L. 87-703), assists multi-county areas in enhancing conservation, water quality, wildlife habitat, recreation and rural development. Work in each area is coordinated by a council. At present, 375 areas have been approved encompassing more than 2,500 counties.

The RC&D Program is a nationwide USDA program administered by the Natural Resources Conservation Service (NRCS). The purpose of the RC&D program is to accelerate the conservation, development, and utilization of natural resources, improve the general level of economic activity, and to enhance the environment and standard of living in designated RC&D areas. Current program objectives focus on improvement of quality of life achieved through natural resources conservation and community development which leads to sustainable communities, prudent use (development), and the management and conservation of natural resources.

RC&D areas are locally sponsored areas designated by the Secretary of Agriculture for RC&D technical and financial assistance program funds. Once the Area was designated by the Secretary of Agriculture, USDA provided until Fiscal Year 2011 a staff person, the RC&D Coordinator, to assist the local group in developing a Council and assist the Council in carrying out its objectives and goals by providing guidance, advice, and “technical assistance.” In general, the Coordinator was a facilitator, advisor, and coach to the RC&D Council. In addition to the Federal RC&D Coordinator, USDA also provided office space and appropriate basic support for program administration. However, in Fiscal Year 2011, Congress removed all funding from the budget for supporting the RC&D Council program, and such funding has never been restored since that time.

The RC&D Council is the heart of the RC&D concept. The Council is a sponsorship-based on nonprofit entity that is established and run by volunteer Board Members to carry out the mission of the RC&D. The Council is composed of members that are key community leaders in land conservation, water management, environmental enhancement, and community development. They are a steering committee and action team to implement community-driven strategic long-range plans to improve the quality of life in the communities in the RC&D Area.

Following the budget reductions of 2011, many Councils that historically were operating across the United States did not survive the loss of funding. However, others continued to operate as establish non-profit organizations with diversified funding streams. From youth environmental education to fire and flood resiliency, Councils "take action" across the United States. RC&D Council members help the Council address specific needs in the community through planning and project implementation. The Council members represent all the counties of the designated Area.
